Alessandro Strozzi (died 1621) was a Roman Catholic prelate who served as Archbishop of Fermo (1606–1621).

Biography
On 10 April 1606, he was appointed during the papacy of Pope Paul V as Archbishop of Fermo.
He served as Archbishop of Fermo until his death in 1621. 
While bishop, he was the principal co-consecrator of Paolo Emilio Sfondrati, Bishop of Cremona (1607).

References 

17th-century Italian Roman Catholic archbishops
Bishops appointed by Pope Paul V
1621 deaths